Marcio Andre Valverde (born 23 October 1987) is a Peruvian footballer. He currently plays for Sport Huancayo in the Torneo Descentralizado.

Club career
Valverde made his professional debut in the Torneo Descentralizado on 30 July 2008 with Alianza Atlético against Sport Ancash.
He participated in the 2009 Copa Sudamericana, finishing the tournament with 3 goals.

On 18 December 2009 Valverde joined one of the most popular clubs in Peru, Sporting Cristal. He signed a two-year contract.

International career
On 14 October 2009 he made his national team debut for Peru in a World cup qualifier game against Bolivia, which finished in a 1–0 victory for Peru. He came on late in the game for Amilton Prado.

On 14 November 2009 Valverde played his second game for his national team, which was a friendly match against Honduras in Miami. He started and was substituted in the 46th minute for Aldo Corzo. The game finished 2–1 in favor of Peru.

Honours

Club
Sporting Cristal
Torneo Descentralizado: 2012

References

External links

1987 births
Living people
Footballers from Lima
Peruvian footballers
Peru international footballers
Peruvian Primera División players
Alianza Atlético footballers
Sporting Cristal footballers
Universidad Técnica de Cajamarca footballers
Real Garcilaso footballers
Association football fullbacks
Association football wingers
Association football utility players